Alberto Barbieri may refer to:

 Alberto Barbieri (academic) (born 1955), Argentine academic
 Alberto Barbieri (wrestler) (1903–?), Argentine wrestler
 Alberto Barbieri (general) (1882–?), Italian general